Ahalya Lettenberger (born March 19, 2001) is an American Paralympic swimmer who represented the United States at the 2020 Summer Paralympics.

Career
Lettenberger represented the United States at the 2020 Summer Paralympics in the 200 metre individual medley event and won a silver medal.

On April 14, 2022, Lettenberger was named to the roster to represent the United States at the 2022 World Para Swimming Championships.

References

2001 births
Living people
American female freestyle swimmers
Swimmers from Chicago
S7-classified Paralympic swimmers
Medalists at the 2015 Parapan American Games
Medalists at the World Para Swimming Championships
Paralympic swimmers of the United States
Swimmers at the 2020 Summer Paralympics
Medalists at the 2020 Summer Paralympics
Paralympic medalists in swimming
Paralympic silver medalists for the United States
21st-century American women
American female backstroke swimmers
American female medley swimmers